Nakazato may refer to:

Places
Nakazato Dam, dam in Mie Prefecture, Japan
Nakazato Station, Japanese railway station in Kami-Motoyama-cho, Sasebo City, Nagasaki Prefectureon the Nishi-Kyūshū Line.
Echigo-Nakazato Station, Japanese railway station on the Jōetsu Line in Yuzawa, Minamiuonuma District, Niigata Prefecture
Kami-Nakazato Station, Japanese railway station, JR East railway station located in Kita, Tokyo
Ugo-Nakazato Station, Japanese railway station located in Semboku, Akita Prefecture

People with the surname
Harumi Nakazato (born 1962), Japanese sprint canoer
Katsuhito Nakazato (born 1956), Japanese photographer 
Koichi Nakazato (born 1973), Japanese football player
Koji Nakazato (born 1982), Japanese football player
Shūgorō Nakazato (1919–2016), Japanese martial artist
Takahiro Nakazato (born 1990), Japanese football player
Tsuneko Nakazato, real name Nakazato Tsune (1909–1987), pen-name of a novelist in Showa period in Japan

See also
Nakasato (disambiguation)

Japanese-language surnames